Fabens Independent School District is a public school district based in the community of Fabens, Texas (USA). The district is in El Paso County and its Superintendent is Edefonso Garcia.

In addition to Fabens, it includes a small section of Tornillo.

In 2009, the school district was rated "academically acceptable" by the Texas Education Agency.

The Texas Education Agency's college readiness performance data shows that only 3.5% (5 out of 144 students) of the graduates of the class of 2010 of the Fabens school district met TEA's average performance criterion on SAT or ACT college admission tests.

Schools
Cotton Valley Early College High School (Grades 9-12)
Fabens High (Grades 9-12)
Fabens Middle (Grades 6-8)
O'Donnell Elementary (Grades 4-5)
Fabens Elementary (Grades PK-3)

References

External links
 

School districts in El Paso County, Texas